Philidris pubescens is a species of ant in the genus Philidris. Described by Donisthorpe in 1949, the species is endemic to New Guinea.

References

External links

Dolichoderinae
Insects described in 1949
Insects of China
Endemic fauna of New Guinea
Insects of New Guinea